Douglas L. Mann is an American physician. He is currently the Lewin Distinguished Professor in Cardiovascular Diseases and professor of medicine, cell biology and physiology at Washington University School of Medicine in St. Louis.

Education
Mann received his undergraduate training at Lafayette College, in Easton, Pennsylvania and his Medical degree from Temple University School of Medicine, Philadelphia, Pennsylvania.  After finishing his residency in medicine at Temple University Hospital, he completed his cardiology fellowship at the University of California, San Diego.

He was a clinical and research fellow at the Massachusetts General Hospital, Boston, Massachusetts and a research fellow in cardiology at Temple University Hospital. Prior to joining the faculty at Washington University School of Medicine in St. Louis, he was on staff at the Medical University of South Carolina and Baylor College of Medicine. He has been on the faculty at Washington University School of Medicine in St. Louis, where he was the chief of the cardiovascular division.

Research and career
Mann's research on the cellular and molecular basis for heart failure have uncovered an important role for innate immunity in disease progression in the failing heart. He demonstrated that the heart expresses pro-inflammatory cytokines following cardiac injury and that the expression of pro-inflammatory cytokines mimics the heart failure phenotype in experimental models. Clinically, Mann has translated his basic research observations into phase I and phase III trials that have targeted inflammatory pathways in heart failure.

Awards and honors
Mann is a member of the American Society for Clinical Investigation, the American Association of Physicians, the Heart Failure Society of America, the American Clinical and Climatological Association and is a fellow of the American College of Cardiology.  His is the editor-in-chief of JACC: Basic to Translational Science, and an editor for Braunwald’s Heart Disease.

He has received numerous awards including the Michael E. DeBakey award for excellence in research, the Distinguished Mentor Award, American College of Cardiology, and the 2019 Lifetime achievement award from the Heart Failure Society of America and the 2020 lifetime achievement award from the European Heart Failure Association.  He is the past president of the Heart Failure Society and the Medical Alumnus of the Year award from Temple University School of Medicine. He was recognized by Forbes magazine as one of the top 27 cardiologists in the United States.

References

20th-century American physicians
Year of birth missing (living people)
Living people
Lafayette College alumni
Temple University School of Medicine alumni
Medical University of South Carolina faculty
Washington University School of Medicine faculty
Baylor College of Medicine faculty
21st-century American physicians
American cardiologists
Academic journal editors
Fellows of the American College of Cardiology